Air Chief Marshal Sir Wilfrid Rhodes Freeman, 1st Baronet,  (18 July 1888 – 15 May 1953) was one of the most important influences on the rearmament of the Royal Air Force (RAF) in the years up to and including the Second World War.

RAF career
Having joined the Royal Flying Corps in 1914, he saw active service during the First World War as Officer Commanding No. 14 Squadron and then as Officer Commanding 10 Wing and then 9 Wing, and continued to serve in the newly formed RAF during the inter-war years. He was made Commandant of the Central Flying School in 1925, deputy director of Operations and Intelligence at the Air Ministry in 1927 and Station Commander at RAF Leuchars in 1928. He went on to be Air Officer Commanding Transjordan and Palestine in 1930, Commandant of the RAF Staff College, Andover, in 1933.
 
In 1936, as Air Member for Research and Development, he was given the job of choosing the aircraft with which to rearm the RAF, and in 1938 his remit was expanded to include the controlling of their production, which he did with great distinction until 1940. In November 1940 he was moved against his will to become Vice-Chief of the Air Staff. His department, now formed into the Ministry of Aircraft Production (MAP) by the opportunistic Lord Beaverbrook (who took credit for much of Freeman's work) rapidly stagnated, and after two years Freeman was moved back to MAP which he continued to run with distinction.

More perhaps than any other single figure, Freeman was responsible for the RAF ordering the Hawker Hurricane, Supermarine Spitfire, De Havilland Mosquito, Avro Lancaster, Handley-Page Halifax and Hawker Tempest.  He played an equally vital role in the development of the Merlin-engined P-51 Mustang, providing North American Aviation with the original specification and then installing Rolls-Royce Merlin engines in place of the unsatisfactory Allison V-1710 engines.

Honours and awards
 Baronet – 14 June 1945 (Conferred 4 July 1945)
 Knight Grand Cross of the Order of the Bath (GCB – 20 October 1942, KCB – 11 May 1937, CB – 1 January 1932)
 Distinguished Service Order – 23 November 1916
 Military Cross – 27 March 1915
 Mention in Despatches – 22 June 1915, 25 September 1916, 11 December 1917
 Chevalier of the Legion of Honour (France) – 17 August 1918
 Fellow of the Royal Aeronautical Society

References

Further reading
 Furse, Anthony. Wilfrid Freeman: The Genius behind Allied Survival and Air Supremacy, 1939 to 1945. Staplehurst, UK: Spellmount, 1999. 

|-

|-
 

|-
 

|-
 

|-

|-

1888 births
1953 deaths
Baronets in the Baronetage of the United Kingdom
Royal Air Force personnel of World War I
British Army personnel of World War I
Chevaliers of the Légion d'honneur
Companions of the Distinguished Service Order
Fellows of the Royal Aeronautical Society
Knights Grand Cross of the Order of the Bath
Manchester Regiment officers
Recipients of the Military Cross
Royal Flying Corps officers
Royal Air Force air marshals of World War II